Found Footage or found footage may refer to:

 Found footage (appropriation), the use in a film of footage previously made for another purpose 
 Collage film, a film assembled entirely from found footage
 Found footage (film technique), a style of film fiction which simulates the use of found footage
 Found Footage 3D, an American found footage horror film 
 Found Footage Festival, an American film festival and live comedy event